Cadaba is a genus of shrubs in family Capparaceae, with about 30 species. These have simple, alternately set leaves. The zygomorphic flowers, are solitary or stand in small clusters at the end of short side branches. These flowers consist of four sepals, none or four petals with a narrow claw at base and a wider plate at the top, a tube-shaped nectar producing appendix, four or five stamens that are merged for about half their length into a so-called androgynophore, and a gynophore on top of which will develop a cylindrical capsule with one or two cavities that contain many small kindney-shaped seeds, and opens with two valves. The genus name Cadaba is derived from the Arab word "kadhab", a local name for Cadaba rotundifolia. Some species are classified as famine food in southern Ethiopia.

Species include

 Cadaba aphylla
 Cadaba farinosa
 Cadaba fruticosa
 Cadaba glandulosa
 Cadaba insularis
 Cadaba kirkii
 Cadaba natalensis
 Cadaba termitaria

References

External links
GRIN Species List
Cadaba of Zimbabwe

 
Brassicales genera
Taxonomy articles created by Polbot